Strasbourg Airport  is a minor international airport located in Entzheim and 10 km (6.2 miles) west-southwest of Strasbourg, both communes of the Bas-Rhin département in the Alsace région of France. In 2018 the airport served 1,297,177 passengers.

Decline in airport passenger traffic
There was a decline in traffic after Ryanair suspended service in 2004 after a court declared that the airline had received illegal subsidies from the airport.

After the opening of the first phase of the new LGV Est high-speed rail line from Paris to Strasbourg, there was a significant reduction in plane usage, but since 2011, traffic at the airport has grown. However, Air France ceased to operate the route between Strasbourg and Paris-Charles de Gaulle on 2 April 2013, transferring passengers onto rail services operated as tgvair. The opening of the second phase of the LGV Est in July 2016 further reduced travel time to Paris to 1:48 by train.

Facilities

The airport consists of a single two-storey passenger terminal building. The ground floor features the check-in areas as well as the arrivals facilities with three baggage claim belts. The upper floor contains the international and domestic departure lounges and gates. The terminal is equipped with four gates that have jet-bridges as well as some walk-boarding stands.

Airlines and destinations
The following airlines operate regular scheduled and charter flights at Strasbourg Airport:

Statistics

Ground transportation
The airport is served by the Entzheim-Aéroport train station, on the line from Strasbourg to Molsheim. The trip to Gare de Strasbourg takes 7 to 12 minutes.

Accidents and incidents
 Air Inter Flight 148, a flight inbound from Lyon, France, struck a mountain side near Mont Sainte-Odile on 20 January 1992 on descent during the final leg of the approach for Strasbourg's runway 05, killing 87 people.

References

External links 

 
 
 

Airports in Grand Est
Buildings and structures in Strasbourg
Buildings and structures in Bas-Rhin
Transport in Grand Est